Nepal had a total primary energy supply (TPES) of 10.29 Mtoe in 2012. Electricity consumption was 3.57 TWh. 
Most of this primary energy (about 80%) represents solid biofuels used in the residential sector (for heating, cooking etc.).
About 23% of the electricity is imported, with the rest almost completely supplied by hydroelectricity. Nepal also exports hydroelectricity to India in the wet season.

Nepal has no known major oil, gas, or coal reserves, and its position in the Himalayas makes it hard to reach remote communities. Consequently, most Nepali citizens have historically met their energy needs with biomass, human labor, imported kerosene, and/or traditional vertical axis water mills. Energy consumption per capita is thus low, at one-third the average for Asia as a whole and less than one-fifth of the world average.

The country has considerable hydroelectricity potential. The commercially viable potential is estimated at 44 GW from 66 hydropower sites.

In 2010, the electrification rate was only 53% (leaving 12.5 million people without electricity) and 76% depended on wood for cooking. With about 1 toe for every $1,000 of GDP, Nepal has the poorest energy intensity among all south Asian countries. The country has therefore very large energy efficiency potential.

Oil products
Petroleum is the second largest energy fuel in Nepal after firewood and accounts for 11% of primary energy consumption in the country. All petroleum products are imported from India.

At the moment, the import of petroleum products is transacted exclusively between the Nepal Oil Corporation and the Indian Oil Corporation. 75% of the imports are diesel, kerosene and gasoline. Due to the high energy demand in the country, the dependence on petroleum imports is increasing. 
More than 62% of the petroleum products are used in the transportation sector. Besides that, petroleum products constitute important energy sources for cooking purposes in households.

Biomass
Biomass is by far the most important primary energy source in Nepal. Biomass comprises wood, agricultural residues and dung.

One major defect with this is that burning these biomass substances for cooking is a common practice (87.3%) and thus exposing many those living in the house to harmful air pollutants.  Those who cook and live a substantial amount of time in the household (women and children) are exposed to these pollutants and at high risks of acute respiratory infection. In addition, the burning of these biomass fuels often pollutes large quantities of greenhouse gasses (GHGs) into the outside air. One study in a mountain village of Nepal showed that carbon emissions from traditional cooking methods were 8055.47 kg per capita/year.

Biogas
Farming system in Nepal is heavily dependent on livestock, with at least 1.2 million households owning cattle and buffalo. The technical biogas potential is therefore high and is estimated to be at least one million household-size plants, 57% located in the Terai plains, 37% in the hills and 6% in remote hills.

According to Nepal's Alternative Energy Promotion Centre, as of July 2011, 241,920 biogas plants were installed in more than 2,800 Village Development Committees and in all 75 Districts under their Biogas Support Program.

Biogas takes advantage of a process called anaerobic digestion, where microorganisms break down organic matter into methane and carbon dioxide without oxygen. A positive byproduct of biogas is that excess wastes produced by the system can be used as organic fertilizer. Biogas as an alternative energy source helps reduce dependence on low grade energy sources (biomass) which pose significant health risks and contribute to GHG emissions. Barriers that Nepalese have reported facing in relation to biogas implementation include the large upfront capital costs, inability of traditional biogas systems to operate in cold and mountainous climates, and isolation of villages making installation logistics more difficult.

Renewable energy 

Renewable energy in Nepal comes from hydropower, solar energy, biomass, biogas, and wind energy.

Nepal installed hydropower capacity is at 1,016 megawatts (MW), providing most of the country's grid-connected electricity generation. The potential for economically viable  hydropower in Nepal is estimated at 40,000 MW.

In the wet season, Nepal exports its surplus hydroelectricity to India through Indian Energy Exchange. As of 8 June 2022, four of Nepal's hydroelectricity projects export a total of 234 MW of electricity to the Indian market.

See also 
Renewable energy in Nepal
Nepal Electricity Authority

References